Thạch An is a rural district of Cao Bằng province in the Northeast region of Vietnam. As of 2003 the district had a population of 31,942. The district covers an area of 683 km². The district capital lies at Đông Khê.

Administrative divisions
Thạch An District consists of the district capital, Đông Khê, and 15 communes: Đức Long, Danh Sĩ, Lê Lợi, Đức Xuân, Trọng Con, Lê Lai, Thụy Hùng, Thị Ngân, Vân Trình, Thái Cương, Đức Thông, Quang Trọng, Minh Khai, Canh Tân and Kim Đồng.

References

o

Districts of Cao Bằng province